Prince Charles is the former title of Charles III (born 1948), King of the United Kingdom and the other Commonwealth realms. 

Prince Charles may also refer to:

People
 Charles James, Duke of Cornwall & Rothesay (born and died 1629), son of Charles I of England and Henrietta Maria 
 Charles Edward Stuart "Bonnie Prince Charlie" (1720–1788) 
 Charles, Prince of Viana (1421–1461)
 Prince Charles of Castile, later Charles V, Holy Roman Emperor (1500–1558)
 Prince Charles d'Aremberg (died 1669), definitor-general and Commissary of the Capuchin order
 Charles Stuart, Duke of Cambridge (1660–1661), son of James, Duke of York (later King James II of England)
 Charles Stuart, Duke of Kendal (1666–1667), brother of the above
 Charles Stuart, Duke of Cambridge (1677), brother of the above
 Prince Charles of Denmark (1680–1729)
 Prince Charles William of Hesse-Darmstadt (1693–1707)
 Prince Charles Alexander of Lorraine (1712–1780), son of Leopold Joseph, Duke of Lorraine and Élisabeth Charlotte d'Orléans
 Charles-Joseph, 7th Prince of Ligne  (1735–1814), Field marshal and writer, and member of a princely family of Hainaut
 Prince Charles of Hesse-Kassel (1744–1836)
 Charles Ferdinand, Duke of Berry (1778–1820)
 Prince Charles of Prussia (1801–1883)
 Prince Charles of Hesse and by Rhine (1809–1877)
 Charles III, Prince of Monaco (1818–1889)
 Prince Charles, Duke of Penthièvre (1820–1828)
 Charles Edward, Duke of Saxe-Coburg and Gotha (1884–1954), grandson of Queen Victoria 
 Prince Charles, Count of Flanders  (1903–1983), former Belgian regent, second son of Albert I, King of the Belgians and Duchess Elisabeth
 Prince Charles Philippe, Duke of Nemours (1905–1970)
 Prince Charles of Luxembourg (1927–1977)
 Prince Carlos Hugo, Duke of Parma (1930–2010)
 Charles, Prince Napoléon (born 1950)
 Prince Carlo, Duke of Castro (born 1963)
 Prince Charles-Henri de Lobkowicz (born 1964)
 Prince Carlos, Duke of Parma (born 1970)
 Prince Carlos Hugo de Bourbon de Parme (born 1997)
 Prince Charles of Luxembourg (born 2020), son of Guillaume, Hereditary Grand Duke of Luxembourg and second in line to the throne of Luxembourg
 Charles Williams (boxer) (born 1962), professional boxer, known as "Prince Charles"

Places
 Prince Charles (Edmonton), a neighborhood in the city of Edmonton, Canada
 Prince Charles Secondary School, a high school in Creston, British Columbia, Canada

Ships
 Prince Charles (Q ship), a British collier converted for naval use in World War I

See also

 Charles, Prince of Wales (disambiguation)
 Prince Carlos (disambiguation) for people known as Prince Carlos or Prince Carlo
 Prince Karl (disambiguation) for people known as Prince Karl or Prince Karel
 Princess Charles (disambiguation)
 King Charles (disambiguation)
 Lord Charles (disambiguation)
 Sir Charles (disambiguation)
 Charles (disambiguation)